Manuel Luís Nunes Sousa Goucha (born 25 December 1954) is a Portuguese television presenter and journalist  (TVI). The presenter of a long-lasting morning show in RTP (Praça da Alegria), followed by another in rival TVI, Goucha was also known for culinary TV programmes and books, as well as a brief spell as an actor. He also owns a restaurant. Having publicly come out in the late 2000s, is one of the most notorious Portuguese public figures who are openly homosexual. In spite of this, he is often criticized by Portuguese LGBT organizations, whose stance he dismisses.

Until August 2018, Cristina Ferreira presented the morning show Você na TV! with him, which he then continued to present with Maria Cerqueira Gomes. It was in that same show that, in January 2019, Goucha interviewed convicted criminal and Portuguese neo-nazi leader Mário Machado, for a conversation with the theme "Do we need a new Salazar?", which was widely panned. Você na TV! ended in December 2020 and Goucha now presents the afternoon show Goucha, which has been aired by TVI since January 2021.

Career

RTP 
 1979 - Zé Gato (actor)
 1984 - Crónica dos Bons Malandros (actor)
 1984 - Gostosuras e Travessuras
 1986 - Sebastião come tudo!
 1987 - Portugal de Faca e Garfo
 1988 - Sebastião na CEE
 1991 - Sim ou Sopas
 1993 - Olha que Dois
 1994 - Viva à Manhã
 1995 - A Grande Pirâmide
 1995 - Efe-Erre-A
 1996 - Avós e Netos
 2000 - Santa Casa
 1995-2002 - Praça da Alegria

TVI, TVI24 and +TVI 
 1993 - Momentos de Glória
2002-2004 - Olá Portugal
2004–present - Você na TV!
2007 - Casamento de Sonho (Judge)
2008, 2009 and 2011 - Uma Canção para Ti
2009 - Quem é o Melhor?
2010 - Mulheres da Minha Vida (TVI24)
2010 - De Homem Para Homem (TVI24)
2011 - Controversos (TVI24)
2011–present (recurring) - Somos Portugal
2012 - A Tua Cara Não Me é Estranha 1
2012 - A Tua Cara Não Me é Estranha 2
2012 - A Tua Cara Não Me é Estranha - Duetos
2013 - A Tua Cara Não Me é Estranha 3
2013 - Tu Cá Tu Lá (+TVI)
2014 - MasterChef Portugal (Season 1)
2014 - A Tua Cara Não Me é Estranha - Kids
2015 - MasterChef Portugal (Season 2)
2015 - Pequenos Gigantes (Judge)
2016 - MasterChef Júnior Portugal 
2017 - MasterChef Júnior Portugal
2018 - Secret Story 7 (Reality TV Show)
2018 - Secret Story: O Reencontro (Reality TV Show)

Presenting World Events on TVI:
2011 - William & Kate's Wedding (UK)
2011 - Charlene & Alberto of Monaco's Wedding (Monaco)
2013 - Launch of TVI Internacional in the USA (New York City)
Specials:
2003 - Mãe Querida - "Mother's Day Special"
 2005 - Gala de Natal TVI (TVI's Christmas Show)
 2006 - Gala de Natal TVI (TVI's Christmas Show)
2007 - Viagem ao Mundo das Maravilhas 
 2007 - Gala de Natal TVI (TVI's Christmas Show) 
2008 - Todos com Portugal 
 2008 - Gala de Natal TVI (TVI's Christmas Show) 
 2009 - Gala de Natal TVI (TVI's Christmas Show) 
2010 - Gala Nicolau Breyner - 50 Anos de Carreira 
 2010 - Gala de Natal TVI (TVI's Christmas Show) 
2011 - Especial Festas de São Mateus em Elvas
2011 - Especial Festas da Senhora da Agonia em Viana do Castelo
 2011 - Gala de Natal TVI (TVI's Christmas Show)
2012 - Gala de Natal TVI, with Cristina Ferreira (TVI's Christmas Show)
2013 - Parabéns TVI - 20 Anos, with Cristina Ferreira and Fátima Lopes (TVI's Birthday Talk Show)
2013 - Gala 20 Anos TVI, with Cristina Ferreira (TVI's Birthday Show)
 2013 - Gala das Estrelas TVI, with Cristina Ferreira and Fátima Lopes (TVI's Christmas Show)
2014 - Parabéns TVI - 21º Aniversário (TVI's Birthday Talk Show)
 2014 - Gala das Estrelas TVI, with Cristina Ferreira and Fátima Lopes (TVI's Christmas Show)
 2014 - Special guest on Juntos no Verão (talk-show)
 2015 - Parabéns TVI - 22º Aniversário (TVI's Birthday Talk Show)
 2015 - Juntos Fazemos a Festa
 2015 - Natal Especial, with Cristina Ferreira and Fátima Lopes (TVI's Christmas Special Talk Show)
 2016 - Especial Ano Novo - "Juntos Fazemos a Festa", with Cristina Ferreira and Fátima Lopes (TVI's New Year's Eve Special Talk Show)
2017 - TVI Gala das Estrelas with Cristina Ferreira and Fátima Lopes (TVI's Christmas Show)

Awards 

Manuel Luís Goucha was nominated and won several awards.

References

External links 

 
 
 

1954 births
Living people
People from Lisbon
20th-century Portuguese male actors
Portuguese agnostics
Portuguese television presenters
Gay entertainers
Portuguese LGBT entertainers
Portuguese male television actors
Portuguese gay actors